The 42nd Attack Squadron is a dormant United States Air Force unit assigned to the 25th Attack Group and formerly located at Creech Air Force Base near Indian Springs, Nevada. It flew the General Atomics MQ-9 Reaper unmanned aerial vehicle. The 42nd oversaw the training and combat deployment of aerial vehicle and sensor operators assigned to the Reaper.

Created as the first operational MQ-9 Reaper squadron in 2006, the squadron flew its final sortie and was subsequently placed in a dormant status on 31 January 2020.

History

World War I
The squadron was organized as the 42nd Aero Squadron on 17 June 1917, shortly after the United States declared war on Germany. Based at Camp Kelly, Texas, the squadron flight-trained new pilots as part of the Air Service until demobilized on 21 February 1919.

Training between the wars
The squadron was reconstituted in 1922 and became the 42nd School Squadron in January 1923 as part of the 10th School Group at Kelly Field. In 1924 its lineage was consolidated with that of the 42nd Aero Squadron. The 42nd School Squadron continued its flying training role as part of the Air Corps in 1926, and was assigned to the Advanced Flying School at Kelly Field in 1931.

On 1 March 1935, with the activation of the General Headquarters Air Force, the squadron was redesignated the 42nd Bombardment Squadron, although it remained a training squadron at Kelly until its inactivation in September 1936.

It was organized once again only a month later, as a Regular Army inactive unit assigned to the Eighth Corps Area, on 23 October 1936. These units remained inactive, but had Organized Reserve officers assigned for training.

World War II
In September 1939, the squadron existed only as an inactive cadre of Organized Reserve officers, centered on Brownsville Municipal Airport, Texas. The squadron was reactivated on 1 February 1940 as part of the expansion of the Air Corps anticipating U.S. participation in World War II. It became part of the 11th Bombardment Group based at Hickam Field, Hawaii. Initially flying Douglas B-18 Bolos, the squadron was converting to Boeing B-17 Flying Fortresses when Hickam was attacked by Japanese carrier aircraft as part of the attack on Pearl Harbor.

The 42nd Squadron deployed with the 11th Bombardment Group to Espiritu Santo, where it participated in the Guadalcanal Campaign. It conducted long-range reconnaissance and bombing missions throughout the South, Southwest, Central, and Western Pacific areas until the end of the war, converting to Consolidated B-24 Liberator bombers in 1943.

In 1946, while based on Guam, the 42nd BS was briefly equipped with Boeing B-29 Superfortresses, but had no aircraft or flying mission from 1947 to its inactivation on in 1948.

Strategic Air Command
The squadron was reactivated as a unit of the United States Air Force on 1 December 1948. Assigned to the 11th Bombardment Group as part of the Strategic Air Command, it flew Convair B-36 Peacemaker intercontinental bombers from Carswell Air Force Base, Texas. In 1957 it moved to Altus Air Force Base, Oklahoma, to convert to Boeing B-52 Stratofortresses.

In 1960 was reassigned to the 4043rd Strategic Wing, being re-equipped with B-52E intercontinental heavy bombers. The squadron moved to Wright-Patterson Air Force Base, Ohio by SAC to disperse its heavy bomber force.  Conducted worldwide strategic bombardment training missions and providing nuclear deterrent. Was inactivated in 1963 when SAC inactivated its strategic wings, replacing them with permanent Air Force Wings.  Squadron was inactivated with its aircraft, personnel and equipment transferred to the 34th Bombardment Squadron.

Unmanned aerial vehicles
On 9 November 2006, the squadron was redesignated the 42nd Attack Squadron and reactivated at Creech Air Force Base, Nevada, initially as part of the 57th Wing before being assigned as one of the six unmanned aerial vehicle squadrons of the 432nd Wing, and the only squadron designated as an attack squadron.

The 42nd received its first General Atomics MQ-9 Reaper on 13 March 2007.  Officially combat-operational in Afghanistan since September 2007, the typical MQ-9 system consists of several aircraft, a ground control station, communications equipment/links, spares, and active duty and/or contractor personnel. The crew consists of one unmanned aerial system pilot, one sensor operator and one mission intelligence coordinator.

Lineage
 42nd Aero Squadron
 Organized as the 42nd Aero Squadron on 13 June 1917
 Demobilized on 21 February 1919
 Reconstituted on 8 April 1924 and consolidated with the 42nd School Squadron as the 42nd School Squadron

 42nd Attack Squadron
 Authorized 10 June 1922 as the 42nd Squadron (School)
 Organized on 5 July 1922
 Redesignated 42nd School Squadron on 25 January 1923
 Consolidated with the 42nd Aero Squadron on 8 April 1924
 Redesignated 42nd Bombardment Squadron on 1 March 1935
 Inactivated on 1 September 1936
 Organized as a Regular Army Inactive unit on 23 November 1936
 Redesignated 42nd Bombardment Squadron (Medium) on 22 December 1939
 Activated on 1 February 1940
 Redesignated 42nd Bombardment Squadron (Heavy) on 11 December 1940
 Redesignated 42nd Bombardment Squadron, Heavy c. 1 August 1944
 Redesignated 42nd Bombardment Squadron, Very Heavy on 30 April 1946
 Inactivated on 20 October 1948
 Redesignated 42nd Bomb Squadron, Heavy and activated on 1 December 1948
 Discontinued and inactivated on 1 February 1963
 Redesignated 42nd Attack Squadron and activated on 9 November 2006
 Placed in dormant status on 1 February 2020

Assignments
 Unknown, 13 June 1917 – 21 February 1919 (probably Post Headquarters, Kelly Field and Wilbur Wright Field)
 10th School Group, 5 July 1922
 Air Corps Advanced Flying School, 16 July 1931
 3rd Wing, GHQ Air Force, 1 March 1935 – 1 September 1936 (attached to Air Corps Advanced Flying School)
 Eighth Corps Area as a Regular Army Inactive unit on 23 November 1936
 11th Bombardment Group, 1 February 1940 – 20 October 1948
 11th Bombardment Group, 1 December 1948 (attached to 11th Bombardment Wing after 16 February 1951)
 11th Bombardment Wing, 16 June 1952
 4043rd Strategic Wing, 1 June 1960
 57th Operations Group, 9 November 2006
 432nd Operations Group, 1 May 2007
 25th Attack Group, 12 July 2019

Stations

 Camp Kelly, Texas, 13 June 1917
 Wilbur Wright Field, Ohio, 25 August 1917 – 21 February 1919
 Kelly Field, Texas, 5 July 1922 – 1 September 1936
 Brownsville Municipal Airport, Texas as a Regular Army Inactive unit on 23 November 1936
 Hickam Field, Hawaii, 1 February 1940
 Kualoa Airfield, Hawaii, 5 June 1942
 Mokuleia Airfield, Hawaii, 8 July 1942
 Plaine Des Gaiacs Airfield, New Caledonia, 22 July 1942
 Luganville Airfield, Espiritu Santo, New Hebrides, 23 November 1942
 Kualoa Point Field, Hawaii, 8 April 1943
 Funafuti Airfield, Nanumea, Gilbert Islands, 9 November 1943
 Mokuleia Field, Hawaii, 9 January 1944

 Kahuku Army Air Field, Hawaii, 19 March 1944
 Mokuleia Field, Hawaii, 13 June 1944
 Agana Airfield, Guam, Marianas Islands, 22 September 1944
 Yontan Air Base, Okinawa, Ryukyu Islands, 2 July 1945
 Fort William McKinley, Luzon, Philippines, 11 December 1945
 Northwest Field (Guam) (later Harmon Field), Guam, 15 May 1946 – 20 October 1948
 Carswell Air Force Base, Texas, 1 December 1948
 Altus Air Force Base, Oklahoma, 13 December 1957 – 1 June 1960
 Wright-Patterson Air Force Base, Ohio, 1 June 1960 – 1 February 1963
 Creech Air Force Base, Nevada. 9 November 2006 – 1 February 2020

Aircraft

 Standard J-1, 1917–1919
 Curtiss JN-4, 1917–1919
 Airco DH.4, 1917–1919, 1923–1931
 Douglas O-2, 1926–1933
 Curtiss O-11 Falcon, 1930–1932
 Thomas-Morse O-19, 1930–1935
 Keystone B-3, 1935–1936
 Keystone B-4, 1935–1936
 Keystone B-5, 1935–1936
 Douglas B-18 Bolo, 1940–1941
 Boeing B-17 Flying Fortress, 1941–1943
 Consolidated B-24 Liberator, 1943–1945
 Boeing B-29 Superfortress, 1946
 Convair B-36 Peacemaker, 1949–1957
 Boeing B-52 Stratofortress, 1958–1963
 General Atomics MQ-1 Predator, 2006–2013
 General Atomics MQ-9 Reaper, 2006–present

Decorations

Distinguished Unit Citation
South Pacific, 31 July-30 November 1942

Navy Presidential Unit Citation
Pacific Theater, 7 August-9 December 1942

Air Force Outstanding Unit Awards
6 August 1954 – 15 July 1957
27 October 1958 – 1 June 1960
28 May 2019

Meritorious Unit Award
15 November 2019

See also

 List of American aero squadrons
 List of B-52 Units of the United States Air Force

References

Bibliography

Further reading
Las Vegas Review-Journal, 14 March 2007, Page 3B

External links
Dumboski, Andrew, A1C, USAF. "First attack squadron stands up at Creech AFB", Nellis AFB Public Affairs, 17 November 2006. Retrieved on 27 January 2007.
Defense Update. "MQ-9 Reaper Joins First Unmanned Attack Squadron", Defense Update, 2007.  Retrieved on 6 May 2007.

Military units and formations in Nevada
Indian Springs, Nevada
042